Cassandra is a 1987 Australian horror film directed by Colin Eggleston.

Plot

A young girl is haunted by nightmares of suicide and murder.

Cast
 Tessa Humphries as Jill / Cassandra
 Tegan Charles as young Cassandra
 Lee James as Warren / Robert
 Dylan O'Neill as young Warren
 Shane Briant as Stephen
 Briony Behets as Helen
 Kit Taylor as Harrison

References

External links
 
 Cassandra at Oz Movies
 Cassandra at AustLit

Australian horror films
1987 horror films
Films directed by Colin Eggleston
1987 films
1980s slasher films
Australian slasher films
1980s English-language films
1980s Australian films